Golăiești is a commune in Iași County, Western Moldavia, Romania. It is composed of eight villages: Bran, Cilibiu, Cotu lui Ivan, Golăiești, Grădinari, Medeleni, Petrești and Podu Jijiei.

Composer Valentin Radu is a native of the commune.

References

Communes in Iași County
Localities in Western Moldavia
Populated places on the Prut